Pěnčín may refer to places in the Czech Republic:

Pěnčín (Jablonec nad Nisou District), a municipality and village in the Liberec Region
Pěnčín (Liberec District), a municipality and village in the Liberec Region
Pěnčín (Prostějov District), a municipality and village in the Olomouc Region